Thomas G. Power (born October 21, 1950) is a judge and a former member of the Michigan House of Representatives.

A graduate of Carleton College with a degree in economics, Power attended the University of Michigan Law School before earning a master's degree from the New York University School of Law. He then was an attorney in private practice and served on the Traverse City school board before his election to the House in 1982.

Power served in the House for 10 years before being elected to the circuit court bench in 1992. He has been re-elected three times since then. Power has also served on the Grand Traverse-Leelanau Community Mental Health Board, and is a pilot for the U.S. Coast Guard Air Auxiliary.

References

1950 births
Living people
People from Traverse City, Michigan
Michigan Democrats
20th-century American politicians
20th-century American judges
21st-century American judges
University of Michigan Law School alumni
Michigan state court judges